Monsan may refer to:

Monsan River, a tributary of Lake Monsan in Québec, Canada
Lake Monsan, a stream crossed by the Maicasagi River, in Québec, Canada